Trouble Over Here (also titled Trouble Over Here, Trouble Over There) is a studio album by American go-go band Trouble Funk, released in 1987 by Island Records.

Track listing

Personnel
 Chester "T-Bone" Davis – lead guitar
 Tony Fisher – lead vocals, bass guitar
 Bootsy Collins – bass guitar, drums, electric guitar, keyboard
 Emmett Nixon – drums
 James Avery – keyboards
 Robert Reed – keyboards
 Mack Carey – percussion, congas
 Timothy David – percussion, congas
 David Rudd – saxophone
 Gerald Reed – trombone
 Taylor Reed – trombone, trumpet

References

External links
 Trouble Over Here, Trouble Over There at Discogs.com

1987 albums
Trouble Funk albums
Island Records albums